Yulia Bessolova (born 23 August 1992) is a Russian footballer. She plays as a defender for Chertanovo Moscow. She was described by the Russia national team's former technical director Vera Pauw as a great talent.

Club career
She has played for Izmailovo Moscow since 2011.

International career
She was called up to be part of the national team for the UEFA Women's Euro 2013. On 18 July 2013, she made her debut in a 1–1 draw against Spain.

Personal life
Bessolova was born in Izhevsk.

Honours
Izmailovo Moscow
Runner-up
 Russian Women's Cup: 2013

References

External links
 
 
 
 Julia Bessolova at fussballtransfers.com 
 Yulia Bessolova at soccerdonna.de 

1992 births
Living people
Russian women's footballers
Sportspeople from Izhevsk
Russia women's international footballers
CSP Izmailovo players
Women's association football defenders
FC Energy Voronezh players
FC Chertanovo Moscow (women) players
Russian Women's Football Championship players
21st-century Russian women